Carpiano is a comune (municipality) in the Metropolitan City of Milan in the Italian region Lombardy, located about  southeast of Milan.

Carpiano borders the following municipalities: San Giuliano Milanese, Locate di Triulzi, Melegnano, Cerro al Lambro, Siziano, Landriano and Bascapè.

References

Cities and towns in Lombardy